The following is the list of squads that took part in the men's water polo tournament at the 1960 Summer Olympics.

CF=Centre Forward
CB=Centre Back
D=Defender
GK=Goalkeeper

Argentina
The following players represented Argentina.

 Diego Wolf
 Jorge Lucey
 Alfredo Carnovali
 Roberto Fischer
 Pedro Consuegra
 Ernesto Parga
 Osvaldo Codaro

Australia
The following players represented Australia.

 Michael Withers
 Graeme Sherman
 Keith Whitehead
 John O'Brien
 Ted Pierce
 Dick Thornett
 Tom Hoad
 Allan Charleston
 Keith Wiegard
 Des Clark

Belgium
The following players represented Belgium.

 Bruno De Hesselle
 Jozef Smits
 Roger De Wilde
 Jacques Caufrier
 Nicolas Dumont
 Karel De Vis
 Léon Pickers

Brazil
The following players represented Brazil.

 Jorge Cruz
 Rolando Cruz
 Roland da Cruz
 Luiz Daniel
 Hilton de Almeida
 Márvio dos Santos
 João Gonçalves Filho
 Adhemar Grijó Filho
 Henry Samson

France
The following players represented France.

 Roland Moellé
 René Daubinet
 Alex Jany
 Claude Haas
 Claude Greder
 Roger Neubauer
 Charles Lambert
 Gérard Faetibolt
 André Lochon
 Jacques Meslier
 Jean-Paul Weil

Hungary
Hungary entered a squad of 14 players. They scored 37 goals, including one own goal from the Belgian Jozef Smits.

Head coach: Béla Rajki

Italy
Italy entered a squad of twelve players. They scored 31 goals.

Head coach: Andres Zolyomy

Japan
The following players represented Japan.

 Mineo Kato
 Kanji Asanuma
 Takanao Sato
 Yoji Shimizu
 Motonobu Miyamura
 Shigenobu Fujimoto
 Koki Takagi

Netherlands
The following players represented the Netherlands.

 Ben Kniest
 Harry Lamme
 Fred van der Zwan
 Harro Ran
 Bram Leenards
 Harry Vriend
 Fred van Dorp
 Hans Muller
 Henk Hermsen

Romania
The following players represented Romania.

 Mircea Ştefănescu
 Alexandru Bădiţă
 Aurel Zahan
 Gavril Blajek
 Alexandru Szabo
 Anatol Grinţescu
 Ştefan Kroner

South Africa
The following players represented South Africa.

 William Aucamp
 Ron Meredith
 Leon Nahon
 Frank Butler
 Wally Voges
 Ronald Tinkler
 Stephanus Botha
 Robert Schwartz
 Allan Brown

Soviet Union
The Soviet Union entered a squad of eleven players. They scored 30 goals.

Head coach: Vitaly Ushakov and Nikolai Malin

United Arab Republic
The following players represented the United Arab Republic.

 Abdel Aziz Khalifa
 Amin Abdel Rahman
 Ibrahim Abdel Rahman
 Mohamed Azmi
 Moustafa Bakri
 Moukhtar Hussain El-Gamal
 Gamal El-Nazer
 Dorri Abdel Kader
 Abdel Aziz El-Shafei
 Mohamed Abdel Hafiz

United States
The United States entered a squad of eleven players. They scored 33 goals.

Head coach: Urho Saari (coach), Neill Kohlhase

United Team of Germany
The following players represented the United Team of Germany.

 Hans Hoffmeister
 Achim Schneider
 Hans Schepers
 Bernd Strasser
 Lajos Nagy
 Friedhelm Osselmann
 Dieter Seiz
 Emil Bildstein
 Jürgen Honig

Yugoslavia
Yugoslavia entered a squad of eleven players. They scored 27 goals.

Head coach:

References

External links
 Olympic Report
 

1960 Summer Olympics